The Nuova Famiglia (Italian: "New Family") was an Italian Camorra confederation created in the 1970s and headed by the most powerful Camorra bosses of the time, Carmine Alfieri, the Nuvoletta brothers, Michele Zaza, Luigi Giuliano and Antonio Bardellino, to face Raffaele Cutolo's Nuova Camorra Organizzata, and affiliated with the Sicilian Mafia.

History

The Nuova Famiglia was created on 8 December 1978, to oppose to the rising power of the Nuova Camorra Organizzata created by Raffaele Cutolo.

The confederation included: 

 Michele Zaza, boss of the powerful Zaza clan, and affiliated with Cosa Nostra.
 Carmine Alfieri, head of the Alfieri clan from Nola.
 Lorenzo, Angelo and Ciro Nuvoletta, bosses of the Nuvoletta clan from Marano, close linked with the Cosa Nostra, specifically with the Corleonesi.
 Luigi Giuliano, boss of the Giuliano clan, from the historic centre of Naples.
 Antonio Bardellino, boss of the Casalesi clan, from San Cipriano d'Aversa also linked to Cosa Nostra.
 Michele D'Alessandro, head of the D'Alessandro clan from Castellammare di Stabia.
 Angelo Moccia, boss of the Moccia clan, from Afragola.
 Pasquale Galasso, head of the Galasso clan, from Poggiomarino.
 Valentino Gionta, boss the Gionta clan, from Torre Annunziata.
 Luigi Vollaro, head of the Vollaro clan from Portici.
 Umberto Ammaturo, responsible for the cocaine trafficking from South America to Campania.

The war against Cutolo

The war that ensued between the Nuova Camorra Organizzata and the Nuova Famiglia caused a huge number of victims. This caused in turn a greater attention from the Italian police organizations, pushing Cosa Nostra to accommodate an agreement between the two warring clans, hopefully favouring the Nuova Famiglia, which included a lot of former allies.

It appears that Alfieri had already decided to eliminate the senior NCO leaders, in revenge for the murder of his brothers during the war. In November 1982, the NCO's financier, Alfonso Ferrara Rosanova, was murdered. When his deputy and main 'military' chief, Vincenzo Casillo was killed via car bomb in January 1983 by Alfieri's ally, Pasquale Galasso, it was clear that Raffaele Cutolo had lost the war. His power declined considerably. Not only Cutolo but many other Camorra gangs understood the shift in the balance of power caused by the death of Casillo. They abandoned the NCO and allied themselves with Alfieri.

The elimination of the key NCO figures not only marked the end of the NCO's defeat as a political and criminal force, but also the rise of Carmine Alfieri and the NF who, by now, virtually unopposed, replaced them as the main contact of the politicians and businessmen in Campania as well as other criminal organizations. These chain of killings, including that of Cutolo's son, Roberto Cutolo who was shot dead by members of the Fabbrocino clan on 24 December 1990, aged 28, coupled with the incarceration of many of its members brought an end to the Nuova Camorra Organizzata.

Internal war

After the defeat of Cutolo, war broke out among the anti-NCO coalition, in particular between the Nuvoletta clan from Marano and Antonio Bardellino at the end of 1983. With Carmine Alfieri siding with Bardellino’s Casalesi clan. The war culminated in the Torre Annunziata's massacre of August 1984, which left eight people killed and 24 wounded among the Gionta clan allied with Nuvoletta. After the massacre and the murder of Ciro Nuvoletta two months earlier, the balance of power shifted in favour of Alfieri and Bardellino.

The end
On May 26, 1988, Antonio Bardellino was murdered by his right-hand man, Mario Iovine in his Brazilian home at Búzios, a beach side resort for the rich and famous in the State of Rio de Janeiro, as part of an internal feud within the Casalesi clan.

In 1992, Pasquale Galasso decided to turn state's evidence, becoming the most important pentito inside the Camorra organization. After him, Carmine Alfieri was arrested and following Galasso, also decided to cooperate with the state.

Lorenzo Nuvoletta, because of a serious illness, after a time in jail, was granted house arrest. He died on April 7, 1994, from liver cancer. Marking the end of the Nuova Famiglia.

Historical leadership

Bosses
1970s-1985 - Antonio Bardellino, Michele Zaza, Lorenzo Nuvoletta, Carmine Alfieri
1985-1988 - Antonio Bardellino (murdered)
1988-1994 - Lorenzo Nuvoletta

See also

 Nuvoletta clan
 Camorra
 Sicilian mafia
 Antonio Bardellino
 Nuova Camorra Organizzata
 Lorenzo Nuvoletta
 Carmine Alfieri
 Michele Zaza

References

Behan, Tom (1996). The Camorra, London: Routledge, 

1970s establishments in Italy
1990s disestablishments in Italy
Camorra clans